Pollenia contempta is a species of cluster fly in the family Polleniidae.

Distribution
France, Italy, Portugal, Spain, Tunisia.

References

Polleniidae
Insects described in 1863
Diptera of Europe
Diptera of Africa
Taxa named by Jean-Baptiste Robineau-Desvoidy